{{Infobox Indian political party
| name =Samajwadi Gathbandhan
| colorcode = 
| leader = Akhilesh Yadav
| foundation = 
|ideology = Big tentMajority:SecularismSocialism Left wing populism
|political position =Left-wing
| loksabha_seats        =  
| rajyasabha_seats      =  {{small|(SP:3, RLD:1, IND:1)}}
| state_seats_name      = Uttar Pradesh Legislative Assembly 
| state_seats           = 

}}Samajwadi Gathbandhan''' is a political alliance led by Samajwadi Party in Indian state of Uttar Pradesh.

2022 Uttar Pradesh Legislative Assembly election
RLD was the first to join the alliance. The NCP and RJD too joined the alliance later. Various other smaller parties too joined while SBSP broke away from its alliance to join SP alliance. During the first seat sharing talks, SP agreed to give RLD 36 seats. Initially, RLD demanded 60 seats while SP were willing to give up to 30, later both the parties finalised at 33 with RLD mostly competing in West UP. RLD gave 8 symbol of SP candidates. Aam Aadmi Party and Samajwadi Party began talks for alliance, however they couldn't agree on seat sharing. Pragatisheel Samajwadi Party (Lohiya) joined the alliance later. On 13 January 2022, the alliance announced its initial candidates for the first few phases of the election. SP and SBSP would have a friendly fight on 1 seat while SP and AD(K) would have a friendly fight on 2 seats.

2024 Parliamentary election
CPI(M) General Secretary Sitaram Yechury said that his party will ally with Samajwadi Party in Uttar Pradesh. Akhilesh Yadav said that the Gathbandhan will contest all 80 seats in 2024 election and detailed elaboration regarding alliance will be made at the end of 2023.

Current members

References

Political party alliances